Massa is a town in the District of Jebel el-Akhdar in north-eastern Libya. It is located 10 km west of Beida. During Italian rule, the town was known as Luigi Razza, probably after the late Italian politician of the same name.

There is an association in Massa named Ain as Saqr interested in gathering Libyan antiquities.

Photo gallery

See also
 List of cities in Libya

External links
Satellite map at Maplandia.com

References

Populated places in Jabal al Akhdar